Sara Lee or Sarah Lee may refer to:

 Sarah Bowdich Lee (1791–1856), English writer and naturalist
 Sarah Lee (reporter) (born 1971), Korean American reporter for CNN
 Sarah Lee (golfer) (born 1979), South Korean professional golfer
 Sarah Tomerlin Lee, magazine editor and interior designer
 Sarah Lee (cyclist) (born 1987), Hong Kong professional racing cyclist
 Sara Lee (wrestler) (1992–2022), American professional wrestler
 Sara Lee (musician), English bassist and singer-songwriter
 Sarah Lee (actress), a Hong Kong-based actress, see School on Fire
 Sara Lee Corporation, an American consumer-goods company